This is list of archives in Russia.

Archives in Russia 
Archive of the President of the Russian Federation
Russian State Archive of Contemporary History
Russian State Archive of Socio-Political History
State Archive of the Russian Federation. Location: Moscow
Russian State Archive of Literature and Art
Russian state archive of economy. Location: Moscow.
Russian state archive in Samara
Russian state archive of scientific-technical documentation. Location: Moscow
Russian state military archive. Moscow
Russian state historical archive. Saint Petersburg
Central state archive of scientic-technical documentation of Saint Petersburg
Central state archive of Saint Petersburg
State archive of Kaliningrad oblast. Kaliningrad
Kaliningrad city archive
State archive of Svyerdlovsk oblast. Yekaterinburg
State archive of Primorsk krai. Vladivostok
Russian state historical archive of Dal'niy Vostok. Vladivostok

See also 

 List of archives
 List of museums in Russia
 Culture of Russia

Further reading

External links 

 
Archives
Russia
Archives